Jean Leclerc,  (born May 28, 1958) is a Canadian businessman and former politician.

Born in Quebec City, Quebec, the son of Jean-Robert Leclerc and Suzanne Lajeunesse, Leclerc received a Bachelor's degree from Université Laval in 1977. In 1977, he started working at Biscuits Leclerc, a cookie and snack manufacturer founded in 1905 by François Leclerc (Jean Leclerc’s great-grandfather). In 1985, he was elected to the National Assembly of Quebec for Taschereau. A Liberal, he was re-elected in 1989. He did not run in 1994. He was Minister of government services, vice-president of the Treasury Board, and Minister responsible for the Quebec City region.

In 1995, he re-joined his family firm as a Vice-President. In 2003, he was appointed president and CEO. In 2006, he was Chairman of the Quebec City 400th Anniversary Society.

In 2009, he was made a Knight of the National Order of Quebec.

References

1958 births
French Quebecers
Knights of the National Order of Quebec
Living people
Politicians from Quebec City
Quebec Liberal Party MNAs